His Majesty Lifeguard Jaeger Regiment, short also Lifeguard Jaeger Regiment (or: LG Jaeger Regiment), was a Jäger regiment of the Russian Imperial Guard from 1796 to 1917.

History 
The history of the LG Jaeger Regiment began in the year 1792 with the introduction of a new branch of service – the light infantry – under the leadership of Paul I of Russia. This new service branch was named Jaeger… (ru: Егер… in reference to the German noun Jäger). The role of the new corps matched those of the rifle regiments of the contemporary British Army and the Chasseurs of the French Army.

The first step taken was to identify suitable recruits from among the so-called Gattchino troops (ru: Гатчинские войска / Gatchinskie voyska) in Gatchina and Pavlovsk, and to concentrate these men in separate Jaeger companies under the command of Major Anton Rachinski. At the end of 1793 there was further restructuring, followed by the formal establishment of the new regiment in 1794. The adoption of light to medium green facings for the jaeger, using green camisol, was an innovation in the Russian Army.

By All Highest Order (i.e. from the tsar) dated November 20, 1796; all units of the Gattchino troops received the status of "Old Guard" (ru: старая гвардия). The hitherto separate Jaeger companies were further concentrated into a jaeger battalion, strengthened by a third Jaeger company. The already existing guard regiments: the Semjonov LG Regiment and the Ismailov LG Regiment, as well as the new LG Jaeger Battalion were all put under a common command. November 20, 1796 was henceforth to be celebrated each year as being the official date of the regiment's foundation. Anton Rachinski, now promoted to podpolkovnik, became the first commanding officer of the LG Jaeger Battalion. In 1800, Prince Bagration, Pyotr Ivanovich, replaced him. In order to strengthen the battalion, a third Jaeger company was added. During the Battle of Austerlitz, the new Jaeger Corps received their baptism of fire and performed with distinction. 
 
On May 22, 1806 the personnel strength of the battalion was doubled. This expansion led to the unit being renamed as LG Jaeger Regiment. A third battalion was recruited, in order to provide a further strengthening of the new regiment. In 1809 Polkovnik Karl von Bistram became the new commander. After sffering heavy losses during the Russo-Turkish War (1877–1878) in fighting close to Varna on September 10, 1828, the second battalion had to be re-established. To provide the numbers needed detachments of the 13th and 14th Jager Regiments were transferred to the LG Jaeger Regiment.

During a holy memorial service on the battle area to Kulm in the year 1835, Nicholas I of Russia in person was evaluating the extraordinary merits of the LG Jager Regiment. In this connection the day of the Saint and martyr Miron, August 17, was selected to holyday or "great day of the regiment". From this point in time Miron became the patron saint of the regiment, and in 1854 the regiment's church received his name. In 1855 the regiment was renamed to Lifeguard Gatchinski Regiement. However, this decision was cancelled on the occasion of the great day of the regiment in 1870.

Regiment barracks 

At the time of its creation the LG Jaeger Regiment was based in the Semyeonov barracks in the street Svenigorodskaya ulitsa (later: Old Jaeger-street; Starojaegerskaya ulitsa). Afterwards the regiment was relocated to the especially newly built New Jaeger Barracks in the street Rusovskaya ulitsa, No. 14, No. 16 und No. 18.

The winter barracks of the regiment: the so-called "Petersburg quarters", was located close to the Semyenov place.

Regimental church 
The Lifeguard Jaeger church was consecrated to "Saint and martyr Myron". Emperor Nicholas I financed the building from the Privy Purse. The church itself was located close to the riverside of the Obvodnyi canal, near the estuary to the Vvedenskiy canal. It was constructed during the period from 1849 to 1854 in memory to the victory of the coalition forces of Russia and Prussia in the Battle of Kulm against Napoleon, August 17, 1813, and the day of Saint Miron. Building was  according to the plans of the architect Konstantin Thon. Distinguished officers of the regiment were laid to rest there.

The church also served as a war memorial to the fallen in World War I. However, following the suppression of the Russian Orthodox Church the church of was used as a storehouse up to 1930. In 1934 the already-damaged building was demolished.
Today the former location of the church contains only a carwash. In line with city and church plans, the historic regimental church is to be reconstructed in accordance with the original plans and documents.

Colours

Uniforms and physical appearance
Throughout its history under the Russian Empire, the regiment wore the standard uniform of the Infantry of the Imperial Guard, which from 1683 to 1914 was predominantly of a dark green (eventually verging on black) colour. The main distinctions of the Lifeguard Jaeger Regiment were the light green facings (plastron, cuffs and shoulder straps) edged in white piping. Collars were of the same dark green as the tunic; piped in red and worn with distinctive regimental patterns of braid (litzen). In addition, the tsar's monogram appeared on the soldiers' crimson shoulder straps and officers' epaulettes (see charts below). In 1896, in recognition of service during the Russo-Turkish War, the entire regiment received the right to wear small bronze scrolls enscribed "For Telich 12 October 1877" on its full-dress shakos. This distinction continued until World War I

A peculiarity of the Russian Imperial Guard was that recruits for most regiments were required to meet certain criteria of physical appearance, in order to provide a standardised appearance on parade. This tradition was taken so seriously that during the 19th century the tsar himself might make the selection from a line of new recruits, chalking the regimental initial on the coat of each recruit. For the Lifeguard Jaeger Regiment  conscripts were selected for being relatively short and slim in build.

Bugle-horns
The regiment had the distinction of carrying silver trumpets with the engraving "For distinction in the Battle of Kulm 17 August 1813". Nicholas II extended this privilege to include the issue of 63 bugle-horns to the Lifeguard Jaegers in place of the drums and fifes of other infantry regiments.

Chiefs of the regiment 
The table below contains the regiment's chiefs or honour commanders from 1796 to 1917.

Battles
The LG Jaeger Regiment participated in the Napoleonic Wars, Russo-Turkish War of 1828–1829, the campaign to put down the November Uprising in Poland in 1830-31, Russo-Turkish War of 1877–1878 and First World War. The table below contains extracts from the combat calendar of the regiment.

1805 — 1878
1805-07 — Napoleonic Wars:
20.11.1805 battle of Austerlitz
24.5.1807 — battle of Lomitten
2.6.1807 — battle of Friedland
1808-09 — Finnish War:
10,15, 18.6.1808 — in fights of the town Kuopio
15.10.1808 — fight of lake Porovesy (close to vil. Idensalmi) 
29-30.10.1808 — fight of vil. Idensalmi
20.11.1808 — occupation of Uleaborg 
26.2.-7.3.1809 — expedition of Alandskie (one battalion) in the corps of Pyotr Bagration 
1812 — French invasion of Russia 
5.8.1812 — Battle of Smolensk 
24-26 August 1812 — Battle of Borodino 
5.11.1812 — battle in the area of Krasny-Dobroe
1813-14 — battles abroad: 
8-9 May 1813 — battle of Bautzen
17.8.1813 — battle of Kulm
4, 6.10.1813 — Battle of Leipzig
19.3.1814 — occupation of Paris 
1828—1829 — Russo-Turkish War 
28.8.-29.9.1828 — conquest and occupation of the Varna region  
10.9.1828 — fight of Hadshi-Hassan-Lap 
14.9.1828 — assault and occupation of the strong point close to redoubt No. 12 in the Varana region 
16.9.1828 — fight of the Varana region (close to liman Devno) 
18.9.1828 — fight of Kurtepe

1914 — 1917 First World War:
20.8.1914 — encounter battle of Vladislavo
24.8.1914 — fight of the vils. Kshchonov, Gelchv 
25-26 August 1914 — fight of the vils. Zarshov, Urshulin 
2.9.1914 — fight of the Krcheshov BP 
10-13 October 1914 — fights in the region Ivanogorod (in reserv)
19-21 October 1914 — struggles in the region of the vil. Lagov
22.10.1914 — fight of the vils. Khmelnik, Lagevniki 
23.10.1914 — occupation town Pinchov, reg. Nida 
3-7 November 1914 — fights in the region: position Skala - sel. Sulashov 
11.11.1914 — fight of the vils. Poremba, Dzerzhna 
12.1914-01.1915 — regiment in reserv 
5.2.1915 — fight of the vils. Gorki, Kobylin
6, 19.2.1915 — fight of the vil. Vysoke-Malo, hill «85,0»
16-18 July 1915 — fight of the vil. Krupe 
19-20 July 1915 — fight of the vil. Stavok 
30.7.1915 — fight of the vil. Pertilov 
1.8.1915 — fight of the vil. Goleshov 
29.8.1915 — fight of the vils. Ulichely, Antoneytsy 
30.8.-3.9.1915 — fights in the region: lake Korve — vil. Kramnishki 
6.9.1915 — fights in the region: m. Soly — vil. Kzenzuvskie Zaezertsy  
8.9.1915 — fights on lake Rishoe, vils. Antonishki, Andresheevtsy  
9, 13.9.1915 — fight of the vil. Menki 
16, 17, 22.9.1915 — defence battles in the area of Smorgon 
10.1915-6.1916 — regiment in reserve 
15-16 July 1916 — assault in the region: vil. Raymesto on the river Stokhod 
24.7.-24.8.1916 — BP in the region Kukharsky forest 
30.8.-15.9.1916 — BP in the region Svinyukhinsky forest 
9.1916-5.1917 — position fights in the region: Svinyukhinsky forest, Kvadrat forest, and forest Sapog on the Stokhod road
23.6.1917 — assault of vil. Tavotloki 
6-15 July 1917 — defence towns Tarinopol, Zbarazh

Famous people 
The table below contains a selection famous people, who served in the LG Jaeger Regiment.

 Aleksei Antonov — General of the Army, member of the supreme command, Chief of General Staff 1945-46, 1st CS of the coalition armed forces of the Warsaw Pact member states.
Aleksey Arbuzov  — General of the Infantry, participant in the Napoleonic Wars
Ivan Armsgeymer  — bandmaster, composer
Aleksey Baiov  — lieutenant general, Russian military historian
Yevgeny Baratynsky — poet
Nikolay Baumgarten   — general, participant Russo-Turkish War (1828–29), military educationalist
Yakov Bologovsky 
Karl Vrangel — general of the infantry 
Yevgeny Graf — lieutenant general 
Boris Regua — major general
Aleksandr Gueldenschtubbe — general of the infantry
Michael Grabbe — general
Onufry Kvitsinsky — general 
Aleksey Kologrivov — major general
Kibrian Kondratovich — general of the infantry
Nikolay Krivtsov — captain of the LG Jaerger Regiment
Fyodor Lindfors — major general
Michail Matsnev — major general
Pyotp Nesterov — lieutenant general
Vladimir Notbek — general of the infantry 
Vasily Ovander — lieutenant general, participant in the Napoleonic Wars  
Gavriil Okunev — major general
Ivan Pavlov — general of the infantry 
Stepan Polyeshov — lieutenant general 
Aleksandr Ridiger — major general
Boris Richter — lieutenant general
Fyodor Sazonov — major general 
Pyetr Stepanov — general of the infantry
Ilya Tutaev — 
Ivan Cherkmaryov — lieutenant general
Alfons Shanyavsky — goldmine owner
Ivan Shachovskoy — general of the infantry
Vyacheslav Shteyngel — general of the infantry
Dmitry Shcherbachev — general of the infantry

Commanders 
The table below contains the commanding officers of the regiment.

 7 March 1805 — 19 November 1809 — polkovnik Guillaume Emmanuel Guignard, vicomte de Saint-Priest 
 19 December 1809 — 29 May 1821 — polkovnik (from Nov. 21, 1812 major general) Karl von Bistram
 10 August 1821 — 14 March 1825 — major general Yevgeny Golovin 
 14 March 1825 — 10 September 1828 — polkovnik (later on major general) Pavel Gartong  
 13 September 1831 — 3 May 1833 — major general Pavel Shtegelman 
 02.04.1833 — 22.09.1841 — major general Aleksandr von Moller 
 22.09.1841 — 20.03.1850 — major general Vcevolod Solovyov
 20.03.1850 — 02.04.1855 — major general Osip Musnitsky 
 02.04.1855 — 29.02.1856 — major general Yakov Voropay 
 29.02.1856 — 23.04.1861 — major general Wilhelm Hansen
 23.04.1861 — 25.05.1863 — major general Baron Erst von Willebrand
 25.05.1863 — 06.12.1864 — major general 
 06.12.1864 — 08.02.1868 — major general Michael Koropotkin
 13.02.1868 — 17.04.1876 — polkovnik Aleksandr Ellis 
 17.04.1876 — 17.04.1880 — polkovnik (from Oct. 12, 1877 major general) Aleksey Chelishchev
 17.08.1880 — 04.05.1887 — major general Aleksandr Frezer 
 18.05.1887 — 17.02.1891 — major general Khozrev Dolukhanov 
 17.02.1891 — 24.11.1894 — major general Ivan Maltsov 
 24.11.1894 — 20.11.1895 — major general Pavel Shubalov 
 28.11.1895 — 25.04.1900 — major general Andrey Cherkmaryov 
 11.07.1900 — 03.06.1903 — major general Konstantin Rozen 
 03.06.1903 — 18.02.1906 — major general Leonid-Otto Sirelius 
 18.02.1906 — 10.07.1908 — major general Andrei Zayonchkovski 
 10.07.1908 — 14.12.1913 — major general Vladimir Yablochin 
 14.12.1913 — 02.02.1916 — major general Aleksandr Bukovsky 
 02.02.1916 — 10.04.1917 — polkovnik (from Apr. 5, 1816 major general) Boris Grekov 
 05.04.1917 — 08.09.1917 — polkovnik Oleksander Hrekov
 08.09.1917 — 12.1917 — polkovnik Fyodor Shtakelberg

References

External links 
 Saint Petersburg encyclopedia
 Staff-officers and Junior-officers of the LG Jaegerregiment
 Commanders and Chiefs of the LG Jaegerregiment 1806—1834
 Military march of the LG Jaeger Regiment

Infantry regiments of the Russian Empire
Russian military units and formations of the Napoleonic Wars
Russian Imperial Guard
Former guards regiments
Saint Petersburg Governorate
Military units and formations established in 1796
Military units and formations disestablished in 1917
Guards regiments of the Russian Empire